Rockledge is an unincorporated community in Laurens County, Georgia, United States. Rockledge has a post office with ZIP code 30454.

History
A post office called Rockledge was established in 1899. The community was named for a rock formation ("ledge of rock") near the original town site.

The Georgia General Assembly incorporated Rockledge as a town in 1908. The town's municipal charter was repealed in 1995.

References

Former municipalities in Georgia (U.S. state)
Unincorporated communities in Laurens County, Georgia
Unincorporated communities in Georgia (U.S. state)
Populated places disestablished in 1995